Insular Scots comprises varieties of Lowland Scots generally subdivided into:

Shetland dialect
Orcadian dialect

Both dialects share much Norn vocabulary, Shetland dialect more so, than does any other Scots dialect, perhaps because they both were under strong Norwegian influence in their recent past. In ancient times, Pictish was spoken in the islands. Then the Vikings invaded and settled, establishing the Norn language there. Although the islands thereafter owed allegiance to Norway, they became involved politically with Scotland. Scotland annexed the islands in 1472; by then, Scots was spoken.

It should not be confused with the vernacular of the Islands of the Clyde.

References

Shetland
Orkney
Scots dialects